"Mourir sur scène" is a 1983 song by Dalida, and is often recognized as Dalida's most iconic late-career song. The song was written by Michel Jouveaux and Jeff Barnel. Today, it is widely considered to be one of the most popular French songs in music history. In 2022, it was certified diamond in France for accumulated sales of over 1 million.

The single appears on the album Les p'tits mots, released in 1983. This song, not anticipated as a success, was published as the B-side of Les petits mots. Due to the song's success, it would become a staple of Dalida's live repertoire until her final concert in 1987.

Shirley Bassey covered it in English as "Born to Sing", in 1986.

Translations 
Dalida released multiple translations of Mourir sur scène:
 Born to sing, released as a single in the United Kingdom in 1984.
 Quando nasce un nuovo amore, in Italian
 Morir cantando, in Spanish

References 

Songs about death
1983 singles
Dalida songs
Ultratop 50 Singles (Wallonia) number-one singles
Number-one singles in France
1983 songs